Ralston Bowles is an American poet, songwriter, producer, musician and singer from Grand Rapids, Michigan.

Ralston Bowles was born on August 31, 1952 to parents, Buel Bowles of Green Sulphur Springs, West Virginia (1913–2002) and May Jean Morgan of Vincennes, Indiana (1919–1998).

Bowles' song "Fragile", has been recorded by Peter Mulvey, Rachael Davis and Caroline Aiken. His song "Grace", based on a book by author Philip Yancey, What's So Amazing About Grace?.  Which he wrote after reading a pre-publication galley of the book. After the book was published, singer Bono of U2 wrote and released a similar song of the same title, based on the same book; the song appeared on their album All That You Can't Leave Behind.

Bowles has served the western Michigan music scene since 1970, helping the Grand Rapids music scene to flourish while encouraging national artists to make Grand Rapids a tour stop on their schedules. He is the originator and host of the Frederik Meijer Gardens Tuesday Evening Music Club and a supporter of numerous charities through benefit concerts, he has performed alongside many songwriters of note including Arlo Guthrie, the Hothouse Flowers, T-Bone Burnett, Shawn Colvin and the Del McCoury Band.

On August 30, 2009, Bowles was featured in The Grand Rapids Press, in the paper's weekly "Sunday Profile" under the headline "SOUL MAN."

Chronology

2004 Bowles released a debut album, Carwreck Conversations. It was produced by Marvin Etzioni (former member of Lone Justice and producer of Counting Crows, Toad the Wet Sprocket, Peter Case and Grey DeLisle), engineered by David Vaught. The musicians include Sheldon Gomberg (bass) David Raven (drums), Brian Head (percussion), Danny McGough (keyboards) and Eric Heywood (pedal steel). It was recognized with three Jammie Awards: "album of the year", "best folk album" and "artist of the year."

2007 saw the re-release of Carwreck Conversations on Wildflower Records (Judy Collins label; Judy Collins, also Amy Speace, Andy White, Heather Greene, Jimmy Norman, Kenny White, The Saints, Ali Eskandarian and Wes Charlton) into Europe and US.

2008 Rally at the Texas Hotel is released on Wildflower Records into Europe and receives accolades from Swedish and Dutch Americana Music Press. Produced by Marvin Etzioni and features studio contributions by Gurf Morlix, Charlie Sexton, Jagoda and Radoslav Lorković.

2009 Bowles received an acoustic guitar hand-made by his Father-in-law, luthier Lew Fowler. And in 2012 received a special model Galloup Guitar from Brian Galloup who made a matching guitar for Peter Mulvey.

2010 Bowles has completed recording on a new album, produced by Phil Madeira which features a long list of musicians including:

Drums: Bryan Owings
Bass: Chris Donohue
Percussion: Dennis Holt, Steve Hindalong
Guitars: Phil Keaggy, Kenny Greenburg, Paul Gordon, Derri Daugherty, Marc Byrd & Andrew Thompson from Hammock, Gordon Kennedy, Dave Perkins, Kenny Hutson, Gurf Morlix, Colin Linden, Mike Roe, Lynn Nichols, Phil Madeira
Banjo: Dave Perkins
Pedal Steel Guitar: Al Perkins, James Pennebaker, Michael Flanders
Mandolin: Kenny Hutson, David Mansfield
Mandocello: David Mansfield
Fiddle: Jake Armerding, James Pennebaker
Accordion: Jodie Moore, Tim Lauer
Hammond Organ: Tim Akers, Dennis Wage, Phil Madeira
Piano: Richard Souther
Harmony Vocals: Molly Felder, Katy Bowser, Patricia Conroy, Micky Dolenz of The Monkees, Terry Taylor, Dug Pinnick, Glenn Spinner, Phil Madeira and just about every musician who played on the tracks...
Produced and Engineered by: Phil Madeira
Additional Engineering: Glenn Spinner, David Harris, Nate Baldwin
Mix Engineer: Todd Robbins
Mastering Engineer:  Richard Dodd

Discography

Solo albums
 Carwreck Conversations (2004)
 Carwreck Conversations Wildflower Records release in Europe (2007)
 Rally at The Texas Hotel (2008)
 Little Miracles (2010)
 12 Hours (2011)

Compilation albums
 Winter in West Michigan: A Benefit for Heartside Community (song: "Light a Candle") (2002)
 Standing Together: A Benefit for Public Schools ("Remember") (2003)
 Paste Magazine Music Sampler No. 9 ("Everybody but You") (2004)
 One on One (One Songwriter, One Instrument) ("Remember") (2004)
 Words ("Paper Moon") (2004)
 Grand Rapids Compilation ("Velvet Elvis") (2005)
 Standing Together 2: A Benefit for Public Schools ("Utah") (2009)

References

External links
Ralston Bowles official website

Songwriters from Michigan
American rock musicians
Musicians from Grand Rapids, Michigan
Living people
1952 births